The Desert Music and Other Poems was a 1954 Random House book collecting 1949-54 poems by the American modernist poet/writer William Carlos Williams. It is now collected, along with Pictures from Brueghel and Other Poems (1962) and Journey to Love (1955), in the New Directions paperback Pictures from Brueghel and other poems by William Carlos Williams: Collected Poems 1950-1962.

Table of Contents
 "The Descent"
 "To Daphne and Virginia"
 "The Orchestra"
 "For Eleanor and Bill Monahan"
 "To a Dog Injured in the Street"
 "The Yellow Flower"
 "The Host"
 "Deep Religious Faith"
 "The Mental Hospital Garden"
 "The Artist"
 "Theocritus: Idyl I"
 "The Desert Music" set on the El Paso / Juarez border.

Except for the title poem, all the pieces here are in triadic stanza form (with slight exceptions), as in the opening of "The Descent":
          The descent beckons
                            as the ascent beckoned.
                                               Memory is a kind
          of accomplishment,
                           a sort of renewal
                                           even
Parts of "Theocritus: Idyl I" and "The Orchestra" were used in The Desert Music, a composition for chorus and orchestra or voices and ensemble by Minimalist composer Steve Reich in 1984.

1954 poetry books
American poetry collections
Poetry by William Carlos Williams
Random House books